Abd al-Karīm al-Barzanjī (d. 1764) was a Kurdish Shafi'i jurist who served as the Shafi'i Mufti of Medina. He hailed from the Shahrizor region and was from the Barzanji tribe.

References

External links
 English translation of Jaliyat al-Kadr by Manaqib Productions, UK

18th-century Muslim scholars of Islam
People from Medina
1764 deaths
18th-century Kurdish people
Kurdish jurists